X Turkmenistan President Cup (2004)

All matches played at Köpetdag Stadium, Ashgabat.

Group A

Group B

Third Place

Final 

 

2004
President
2004 in Tajikistani football
2004 in Russian football
2004 in Estonian football
2003–04 in Georgian football
FC Vorskla Poltava matches
2003–04 in Iranian football